The Sacramento synagogue firebombings were attacks on three Jewish congregations in Sacramento, California — Beth Shalom, B’nai Israel, and Knesset Israel—by the white supremacist brothers Benjamin Matthew and James Tyler Williams on the night of June 18, 1999.

Aftermath
The Williams brothers murdered a gay couple, Gary Matson and Winfield Mowder, on  July 1, and set fire to Country Club Medical Center, which housed an abortion clinic, on July 2. They were arrested for the murder on July 7.

References

20th-century attacks on synagogues and Jewish communal organizations in the United States
Antisemitism in California
Terrorist incidents in California
Jews and Judaism in California

History of Sacramento, California
Attacks in the United States in 1999
1990s crimes in California
1999 in California
1999 in Judaism